NUPW may refer to:

 National Union of Plantation Workers of Malaysia.
 National Union of Public Workers of Barbados.